National Highway 652, commonly referred to as NH 652 is a national highway in India. It is a secondary route of primary National Highway 52.  NH-652 runs in the state of Maharashtra in India.

Route 
NH652 connects Tuljapur, Andur, Naldurg, Hannur and Akkalkot in the state of Maharashtra.

Junctions  
 
  Terminal near Tuljapur.
  Terminal near Akkalkot.

See also 
 List of National Highways in India
 List of National Highways in India by state

References

External links 

 NH 652 on OpenStreetMap

National highways in India
National Highways in Maharashtra